IC power-supply pins denote a voltage and current supply terminals in electric, electronics engineering, and in Integrated circuit design. Integrated circuits (ICs) have at least two pins that connect to the power rails of the circuit in which they are installed. These are known as the power-supply pins. However, the labeling of the pins varies by IC family and manufacturer. The double subscript notation usually corresponds to a first letter in a given IC family (transistors) notation of the terminals (e.g. VDD supply for a drain terminal in FETs etc.). 

The simplest labels are V+ and V−, but internal design and historical traditions have led to a variety of other labels being used. V+ and V− may also refer to the non-inverting (+) and inverting (−) voltage inputs of ICs like op amps.

For power supplies, sometimes one of the supply rails is referred to as ground (abbreviated "GND") positive and negative voltages are relative to the ground. In digital electronics, negative voltages are seldom present, and the ground nearly always is the most negative voltage level. In analog electronics (e.g. an audio power amplifier) the ground can be a voltage level between the most positive and most negative voltage level.

While double subscript notation, where subscripted letters denote the difference between two points, uses similar-looking placeholders with subscripts, the double-letter supply voltage subscript notation is not directly linked (though it may have been an influencing factor).

BJTs 
ICs using bipolar transistors have VCC (+, positive) and VEE (-, negative) power-supply pins though VCC is also often used for CMOS devices as well. 

In circuit diagrams and circuit analysis, there are long-standing conventions regarding the naming of voltages, currents, and some components. In the analysis of a bipolar junction transistor, for example, in a common-emitter configuration, the DC voltage at the collector, emitter, and base (with respect to ground) may be written as VC, VE, and VB respectively.

Resistors associated with these transistor terminals may be designated RC, RE, and RB. In order to create the DC voltages, the furthest voltage, beyond these resistors or other components if present, was often referred to as VCC, VEE, and VBB. In practice VCC and VEE then refer to the positive and negative supply lines respectively in common NPN circuits. Note that VCC would be negative, and VEE would be positive in equivalent PNP circuits.

The VBB specifies reference bias supply voltage in TTL logic.

FETs 
Exactly analogous conventions were applied to field-effect transistors with their drain, source and gate terminals. This led to VD and VS being created by supply voltages designated VDD and VSS in the more common circuit configurations. In equivalence to the difference between NPN and PNP bipolars, VDD is positive with regard to VSS in the case of n-channel FETs and MOSFETs and negative for circuits based on p-channel FETs and MOSFETs.

CMOS 
CMOS ICs have generally borrowed the NMOS convention of VDD for positive and VSS for negative, even though both positive and negative supply rails connect to source terminals (the positive supply goes to PMOS sources, the negative supply to NMOS sources).  

In many single-supply digital and analog circuits the negative power supply is also called "GND". In "split-rail" supply systems there are multiple supply voltages. Examples of such systems include modern cell phones, with GND and voltages such as 1.2 V, 1.8 V, 2.4 V, 3.3 V, and PCs, with GND and voltages such as −5 V, 3.3 V, 5 V, 12 V. Power-sensitive designs often have multiple power rails at a given voltage, using them to conserve energy by switching off supplies to components that are not in active use. 

More advanced circuits often have pins carrying voltage levels for more specialized functions, and these are generally labeled with some abbreviation of their purpose. For example, VUSB for the supply delivered to a USB device (nominally 5 V), VBAT for a battery, or Vref for the reference voltage for an analog-to-digital converter. Systems combining both digital and analog circuits often distinguish digital and analog grounds (GND and AGND), helping isolate digital noise from sensitive analog circuits. High-security cryptographic devices and other secure systems sometimes require separate power supplies for their unencrypted and encrypted (red/black) subsystems to prevent leakage of sensitive plaintext.

BJTs and FETs mixed 
Although still in relatively common use, there is limited relevance of these device-specific power-supply designations in circuits that use a mixture of bipolar and FET elements, or in those that employ either both NPN and PNP transistors or both n- and p-channel FETs. This latter case is very common in modern chips, which are often based on CMOS technology, where the C stands for complementary, meaning that complementary pairs of n- and p-channel devices are common throughout.

These naming conventions were part of a bigger picture, where, to continue with bipolar-transistor examples, although the FET remains entirely analogous, DC or bias currents into or out of each terminal may be written IC, IE, and IB. Apart from DC or bias conditions, many transistor circuits also process a smaller audio-, video-, or radio-frequency signal that is superimposed on the bias at the terminals. Lower-case letters and subscripts are used to refer to these signal levels at the terminals, either peak-to-peak or RMS as required. So we see vc, ve, and vb, as well as ic, ie, and ib. Using these conventions, in a common-emitter amplifier, the ratio  vc/vb  represents the small-signal voltage gain at the transistor, and  vc/ib the small-signal trans-resistance, from which the name transistor is derived by contraction. In this convention, vi and vo usually refer to the external input and output voltages of the circuit or stage.

Similar conventions were applied to circuits involving vacuum tubes, or thermionic valves, as they were known outside of the U.S. Therefore, we see VP, VK, and VG referring to plate (or anode outside of the U.S.), cathode (note K, not C) and grid voltages in analyses of vacuum triode, tetrode, and pentode circuits.

See also 
4000 series
7400 series
Bob Widlar
Differential amplifier
List of 4000 series integrated circuits
List of 7400 series integrated circuits
Logic family
Logic gate
Open collector
Operational amplifier applications
Pin-compatibility

Notes

References

Integrated circuits

fr:Boîtier de circuit intégré#Broches d'alimentation d'un circuit intégré